Josiah Dickenson Hank Jr. (April 19, 1875 – July 29, 1924) was an American attorney and politician. Appointed assistant Attorney General of Virginia in August 1917, he served as Attorney General after John Garland Pollard resigned the following year.

Early life and education
The son of Rev. Josiah Dickenson Hank, a Methodist minister, and his wife Laura Wailes, daughter of a Maryland physician, was born in Saluda, Virginia He had at least three brothers, one also a lawyer. Educated in private schools in Salisbury, Maryland, he returned to Virginia and received degrees from Randolph-Macon College and the University of Virginia School of Law. His uncle served as chief of staff for Confederate General Joseph Wheeler, and his wife's grandfather was Confederate Major John Pelham.

Career
He taught Greek and English from 1895 until 1899, then from 1901 until 1903 edited legal texts for the Michie Company, until beginning a private legal practice in Norfolk, Virginia. In 1907 he published Hank's Annotations. In August 1917 he accepted an appointment as Assistant Attorney General, and briefly served as Attorney General when John Garland Pollard resigned to campaign for governor.

References

1875 births
1924 deaths
20th-century American politicians
Virginia Attorneys General
Virginia Democrats
Virginia lawyers